Albert Dupontel (born 11 January 1964) is a French actor, film director and screenwriter. Following his father's path, he studied medicine but eventually switched to theater, disillusioned by hospital life. He started his career as a stand-up comedian. In February 1998, his film Bernie took the Grand Prize at the 9th Yubari International Fantastic Film Festival which was attended by Dupontel.

One-man shows

Filmography

As actor

As filmmaker

References

External links

official website

1964 births
Living people
People from Saint-Germain-en-Laye
French people of Breton descent
French male film actors
French film directors
French male screenwriters
French screenwriters
French humorists
French stand-up comedians
20th-century French male actors
21st-century French male actors
Chevaliers of the Ordre des Arts et des Lettres
Best Director César Award winners